Caulophryne jordani, commonly known as the fanfin angler, is a species of fanfin, a type of anglerfish. It has many unusual tentacles with lights attached.

This was the first ever recorded video of a sexually united pair of deep sea anglerfish.

References

Caulophrynidae
Deep sea fish
Fish described in 1896
Taxa named by George Brown Goode
Taxa named by Tarleton Hoffman Bean